Devastation may refer to:

HMS Devastation, any of four ships of the British Royal Navy
La Dévastation, various French warships named Dévastation.
Devastation (video game), a first-person shooter video game developed by Digitalo Studios, released in February 2003
Mortal Kombat: Devastation, a cancelled Mortal Kombat film
Devastation (comics), a fictional character and DC Comics villain in the Wonder Woman comic book
The Transformers: Devastation, a six-issue Transformers comic miniseries
Transformers: Devastation, a 2015 unrelated Transformers video game
The Devastations, a musical group from Melbourne, Australia and based out of Berlin, Germany
Devastation (wrestling), a professional wrestling tag-team from Canadian independent wrestling
Acute stress reaction, a psychological condition that causes devastation
The Devastation, a fictional spaceship in the video game Star Wars: The Clone Wars – Jedi Alliance

See also
 Devastated (disambiguation)
Devastator (disambiguation)